Bishrampur (Nepali: विश्रामपुर) is a rural municipality in Bara District in Province No. 2 of Nepal. It was formed in 2016 occupying current 5 sections (wards) from previous 5 former VDCs. It occupies an area of 19.81 km2 with a total population of 23,785.

References

Populated places in Bara District
Rural municipalities of Nepal established in 2017
Rural municipalities in Madhesh Province